James T. "Ted" Chambers (November 6, 1900 – April 14, 1992) was an American football and soccer coach. He served as the head football coach at his alma mater, Howard University in Washington, D.C., in 1944, compiling a record of 1–4. He also began the school's soccer program.

One of his first coaching assignments was at the Manassas Industrial School for Colored Youth.

Chambers was born in Union, West Virginia. He earned a master's degree in physical education from the University of Pittsburgh. Chambers died on April 14, 1992, at the Walter Reed Army Medical Center in Washington, D.C. after suffering from pneumonia and heart ailments.

Head coaching record

College football

References

1900 births
1992 deaths
Howard Bison athletic directors
Howard Bison football coaches
Howard Bison football players
Howard Bison men's soccer coaches
High school football coaches in Virginia
University of Pittsburgh alumni
People from Union, West Virginia
African-American coaches of American football
African-American players of American football
African-American college athletic directors in the United States
20th-century African-American sportspeople